Candy was a Los Angeles-based rock band, featuring future Guns N' Roses guitarist Gilby Clarke and singer-songwriter Kyle Vincent. Original members were Vincent on lead vocals, bassist Jonathan Daniel, drummer John Schubert, and guitarist Geoff Siegel, who departed the group after six months and later joined the Nymphs. Their music has been described as power pop.

Biography
Candy started playing live in the LA area and recording demos in 1981. Their only studio album, titled Whatever Happened To Fun, produced by Jimmy Ienner, was released in 1985, when the band toured the United States opening up for Rick Springfield and later Corey Hart. Wally Bryson from the Raspberries served as musical director on the album, which was recorded at Criteria Studios in Miami, FL. The music video for the single "Whatever Happened To Fun", directed by Dominic Orlando, was filmed on location in Hollywood, with Candy performing to a street crowd and a mural of famous old Hollywood stars.

In 1986, Vincent left the band to pursue a solo career, with Clarke taking over as lead vocalist and guitarist Ryan Roxie joining the lineup. After Clarke left, the remaining members joined up with new lead vocalist Shane and became the Electric Angels. Vincent has since enjoyed a successful solo career, releasing over 10 albums, touring, and scoring a Billboard Adult Top 20 single, "Wake Me Up (When The World's Worth Waking Up For)"; Daniel is a music industry manager of many top acts, including Sia, Train, Butch Walker, Fall Out Boy, and others; while Schubert went into university and studied history and education. Since 2006, he's taught middle school history and currently teaches in Carmel, CA at All Saints Day School.

In 2003, SongTree Records released "Teenage Neon Jungle (Rare & Unreleased)", a 25-track collection of the band's demos, live tracks, and post-Candy projects, both solo and band. In 2012, Whatever Happened to Fun was released for the first time on CD on the Rock Candy label.

In 2016, Vincent re-recorded and released "Whatever Happened to Fun", as the B-side on his Japan-issued "Narita (Tokyo Girl)" single. The song was recorded in Tokyo using Vincent's Japan Candy band, with Kyle on lead vocals.

Discography

Studio albums 
 Whatever Happened to Fun (1985) Mercury/Polygram
 Teenage Neon Jungle (Rare & Unreleased) (2003) SongTree

Singles
 "Whatever Happened to Fun" (1985) Mercury/Polygram

External links
 Kyle Vincent Official Website
 Gilby Clarke Official Website

American glam metal musical groups
Musical groups established in 1983
American power pop groups
Musical groups from Los Angeles
1983 establishments in California